Convers Avia is an airline based in Tver, Russia. It operates charter flights, mainly within Russia but also as far afield as ice breakers in Afghanistan and Norway. Its main base is Zmeevo Airport which the company founded themselves.

History 
The airline was formed in 1995

Destinations 

The airline flies charters throughout Russia on behalf of numerous major companies, its main activity is acting as a shuttle to take staff to work in remote areas and to ice breakers

Fleet 

, the Convers Avia fleet includes Mil Mi-8, Mil Mi-2 and Robinson R-44 helicopters

References 

Airlines of Russia
Airlines established in 1995
Companies based in Tver Oblast